Saint-Narcisse is the name of several places in Canada:

 Saint-Narcisse, a parish in Quebec
 Saint-Narcisse-de-Beaurivage, a parish in Quebec
 Saint-Narcisse-de-Rimouski, a parish in Quebec
 Saint-Narcisse (film), a 2020 film directed by Bruce LaBruce